Witten invariant may refer to:

Gromov–Witten invariant 
Seiberg–Witten invariant
Quantum invariant